A. H. Miller may refer to:

Alden H. Miller (1906–1965), American ornithologist 
Archie H. Miller (1886–1958), Lieutenant Governor of Minnesota